Joel Francisco Mejía de la Cruz (born 18 August 1990 in Higüey) is a Dominican Republic sprinter. He competed in the 4 × 400 m relay event at the 2012 Summer Olympics.

Personal bests
400 m: 46.32 s A –  Irapuato, 7 July 2012
800 m: 1:49.67 min –  Mayagüez, 17 July 2011

Achievements

References

External links

Sports reference biography
Tilastopaja biography

1990 births
Living people
Dominican Republic male sprinters
Olympic athletes of the Dominican Republic
Athletes (track and field) at the 2012 Summer Olympics
People from La Altagracia Province
Dominican Republic male middle-distance runners